Santiago Island is one of the Galápagos Islands. It is also known as San Salvador, named after the first island discovered by Columbus in the Caribbean Sea (see San Salvador Island), or as James Island. The volcano in the island's southeast erupted along a linear fissure, and is much lower. The oldest lava flows on the island date back to 750,000 years ago.

Geology

Santiago Island was formed from a shield volcano eponymously named Santiago. The low, flat summits of the volcano allowed the low-viscosity lava to flow for large distances from the source vents. The volcanic origin of the island has led it to be dotted with holocene pyroclastic rock that can be found across the island. On the eastern and western sides of the island, tuff cones, formed from the rapid interaction of hot lava and water, are visible. The summit of the volcano is on the northwestern part of the island and the last recorded volcanic activity on Santiago Island was between 1904 and 1906.

Wildlife

Like the other islands of the Galápagos archipelago, Santiago Island is rife with wildlife, particularly species endemic to the Galápagos. Some animals commonly seen on the island include the Galápagos Fur Seal, Galápagos Sea Lion, Sally Lightfoot Crab, Marine Iguana and Galápagos Land Iguana, Bottlenose Dolphin, Rice Rat, and Microlophus. Charles Darwin in October 1835 noted that the island's population of land iguanas was immense: "I cannot give a more forcible proof of their numbers than by stating that when we were left at James Island we could not for some time find a spot free from their burrows on which to pitch our single tent." On the plants and vegetation, Darwin observed, "As in the other islands, the lower region was covered by nearly leafless bushes, but the trees were here of larger growth than elsewhere. The upper region, being kept damp by the clouds, supports a green and flourishing vegetation."

Restoration
The Directorate of Galápagos National Park and Island Conservation reintroduced 1,436 Galápagos Land Iguanas (Conolophus subcristatus) to Santiago Island on 4 January 2019 after a 180 year absence. The partners reintroduced the land iguanas in an effort to restore the island's ecological health and to provide the opportunity for this iguana species to thrive. Land iguanas were sourced from North Seymour Island, where they were introduced in the 1930s and have increased to over 5,000 and faced a lack of food availability. Charles Darwin was the second-last person to record land iguanas alive on Santiago Island in 1835, with Abel-Nicolas Bergasse du Petit-Thouars being the last in 1838.

See also
Volcanoes of the Galápagos Islands
Action off James Island

References

External links

 

Islands of the Galápagos Islands
Volcanoes of the Galápagos Islands
Shield volcanoes of Ecuador
Polygenetic shield volcanoes
Pleistocene shield volcanoes
Holocene shield volcanoes